The Keystone, also known as the H.B. Burns Memorial Building and Medical Faculty Associates, is a building on the campus of George Washington University in Washington, D.C.  It was listed on the District of Columbia Inventory of Historic Sites and the National Register of Historic Places in 2010. The building is home to the George Washington University Medical Faculty Associates.

History
The building was designed by Robert O. Scholz in the Art Deco style and completed in 1931.  It is a twelve-story building that was formerly known as The Keystone apartment building.  It was acquired by the university and dedicated on February 15, 1971 as the University Clinic, or Burns Clinic.  It was named in honor of H.B. Burns, the deceased brother of Jacob Burns.

Architecture
The Burns Memorial Building is similar in massing to the nearby Munson Hall and Jacqueline Bouvier Kennedy Onassis Hall.  The exterior of the building is faced with yellow brick and cast stone.  Metal panels that feature decorative scrollwork are found below the windows and above the main entrance.

See also
Corcoran Hall
Fulbright Hall 
Madison Hall 
Stockton Hall
Hattie M. Strong Residence Hall

References

External links

Medical Faculty Associates

1931 establishments in Washington, D.C.
Art Deco architecture in Washington, D.C.
University and college buildings completed in 1931
Foggy Bottom
George Washington University buildings and structures
University and college buildings on the National Register of Historic Places in Washington, D.C.